The 1980 Women's College World Series (WCWS) was held in Norman, Oklahoma on May 22–25, the first time it was played at a location other than Omaha, Nebraska, where it had been held for its first 11 years. Sixteen fastpitch softball teams emerged from regional tournaments to meet in the AIAW national collegiate softball championship.

Teams

The 1980 season was the first time that AIAW softball competition was split into three divisions (I, II and III) with each conducting its own championship tournament. The Division I double-elimination tournament included these teams:

 Cal Poly–Pomona
 Cal State–Fullerton
 California
 Creighton
 Indiana
 Massachusetts
 New Mexico
 Oklahoma
 Oklahoma State
 Oregon
 South Carolina
 Southwest Missouri State
 Texas A&M
 Utah State
 Western Illinois
 Western Michigan

The Utah State Aggies, behind the pitching of Mary Lou Ramm, won its first national championship, emerging from the losers' bracket to defeat Indiana with 1–0 and 2–1 wins in the final. Ramm was named the Most Outstanding Player of the tournament. Utah State's only loss had been to Indiana in the fourth round, forcing the Aggies to defeat top-seeded Texas A&M in order to again face the Hoosiers in the final.

Bracket

Source:

Ranking

See also

References

1980 AIAW Division I softball season
Women's College World Series
Women's College World Series
Women's College World Series
Women's College World Series
Women's College World Series
Women's sports in Oklahoma
Norman, Oklahoma